Sioux Valley Dakota Nation (SVDN) or Wipazoka Wakpa ('Saskatoon River', named for the abundance of Saskatoon bushes along the river) is a Dakota (Sioux) First Nation that resides west of Brandon, Manitoba.

The Sioux Valley Dakota Nation has a total population of around 2,400. Around 1,080 of the population resides on the Sioux Valley Dakota Nation Reserve, which is located by the southeast corner of the Rural Municipality of Wallace - Woodworth.

Reserves
The First Nation have two reserves, their main reserve and one in which they share.
 Sioux Valley Dakota Nation — 
 Fishing Station 62A — shared reserve with Birdtail Sioux and Canupawakpa Dakota First Nations

Notes

External links
www.dakotanation.com
Map of Sioux Valley Dakota Nation at Statcan
Sioux Valley Dakota Nation Governance Act, S.C. 2014, c. 1

Dakota Ojibway Tribal Council
First Nations governments in Manitoba
Dakota
Indian reserves in Manitoba
First Nations in Southern Manitoba